Fleetwing is a 1928 American silent drama film directed by Lambert Hillyer and written by Elizabeth Pickett Chevalier and Alex Troffey. The film stars Barry Norton, Dorothy Janis, Ben Bard, and Bob Kortman. The film was released on June 24, 1928 by Fox Film Corporation.

Cast
Barry Norton as Jaafor
Dorothy Janis as Thurya
Ben Bard as Metaab
Bob Kortman as Auda
Erville Alderson as Trad Ben Sabam
James H. Anderson as Mansoni
Blanche Friderici as Furja

Preservation
The film is now considered lost.

See also
List of lost films
1937 Fox vault fire

References

External links

1928 drama films
1928 films
Silent American drama films
American silent feature films
American black-and-white films
Lost American films
Fox Film films
1928 lost films
Lost drama films
Films directed by Lambert Hillyer
1920s American films